Cherry Lane Music was an American music publisher based in New York. It was founded in 1960 by Milton Okun in the apartment above the Cherry Lane Theater in Greenwich Village, Manhattan, New York. Cherry Lane Music developed a wide range of high quality sheet music, DVDs, and educational tools for musicians. In March 2010, Cherry Lane was acquired by BMG Rights Management, which had been formed in 2008 jointly by Bertelsmann AG and Kohlberg Kravis Roberts & Co.  BMG operated Cherry Lane as a subsidiary and is currently an in-name-only unit of BMG Rights Management.

History 
The print company's portfolio included sheet music of performing artists from a wide variety of genres, including Kenny Rogers, The Black Eyed Peas, John Denver, Elvis Presley, John Legend, Quincy Jones, Barbra Streisand, John Mayer, the soundtrack to the Pokémon franchise, the White Stripes, the Dave Matthews Band, Metallica, and Jack Johnson.

When BMG acquired Cherry Lane in 2010, the number of copyrighted musical works was approximately 150,000. The estimated acquisition price ranged between 85 and 100 million US dollars.

Cherry Lane Music distributed products through Hal Leonard, another US-based music publisher. As of 2019, BMG no longer lists Cherry Lane as a subsidiary or a company brand. Its website was merged into BMG's "new music company" website.

Selected types of folios 
Cherry Lane provided a number of different kinds of personality folios aimed at musicians of all skill levels.

See also
 Music Publisher

References

Sheet music publishing companies
Publishing companies established in 1960